Mifsas Bahri, at 2472 m altitude, is a Late Aksumite archaeological site in the Tigray region of Ethiopia.

This highland site contains the ruin of a substantial building constructed of bright red dressed ashlar which may date as early as the late phases of the Aksumite period. Lying 200 m west of the shore of Lake Hashinge, the site came to the attention of antiquities authorities in 1997 as a result of alleged exploitation of its building stone on the part of the local population. In 2013 a group led by Paul A. Yule from Mekelle University and Heidelberg University began to investigate the site. Curiously, the site lies 100 km south of the next site attributable to the Aksumite cultural assemblage (Wuqro), thus far south of the Aksumite site distribution. The building at Mifsas Bahri is a church, to judge from the orientation, masonry excellence and architectural relief sculpture. Preliminarily, the building appears to have undergone three phases including a squatter occupation. Radiocarbon dating suggests that it went out of use in the 15th century.

Historical reconstruction and local tradition had it that it was destroyed in the 1540s by the mixed forces of Aḥmad ibn Ibrahīm al-Ġazī. This contradicts a few recent unpublished radiocarbon dates, which suggest a building and construction considerably earlier. Excavation confirmed the presence of a monumental stone building some 20 m x 35 m in surface area. According to local sources the church was named Gebre Menfes Kidus.

See also 
 Archaeology of Ethiopia

References

Further reading
Tekle Hagos, Archaeological Rescue Investigations in Southern and Eastern Tigray Administrative Zones, Annual of the Federal Authority for Research and Conservation of Cultural Heritage (ARCCH, 2001), sene EC1994, 9–14 (Amharic).
W. Arnold–S. Degenhardt–Fessehe Berhe–B. Gabriel–M. Gaudiello–M. Hazarika–Hiruy Daniel–Yohannes Gebre Selassie–P. Yule, Field Report for Mifsas Baḥri, Second Preliminary Internal Report, 2014.
M. Gaudiello‒P. Yule (eds.), Mifsas Baḥri, a Late Aksumite Frontier Community in the Mountains of Tigray, Survey, Excavation and Analysis 2013‒6, Oxford, BAR International Series S2839, 2017,

External links

M. Gaudiello–C. Hilbrig–S. Partheil–P. A. Yule, Mifsas Baḥri, Fourth Preliminary Internal Field Report, 2016 Season
 Fessehe Berhe–M. Gaudiello–M. Hazarika–C. Hilbrig–A. Mortimer–S. Partheil–Tsehay Terefe–S. Yilmaz–Yohannes Gebre Selassie–P. A. Yule, Mifsas Baḥri, Third Preliminary Internal Field Report, 2015 Season

Archaeological sites in Ethiopia
Tigray Region
History of Ethiopia
Archaeological sites of Eastern Africa